Melissa Paige Li Kun Wu (born 3 May 1992) is an Australian diver who has represented Australia at four Olympic Games, winning a silver medal at the 2008 Olympic Games and a bronze medal at the 2020 Olympic Games. She has also represented Australia at five Commonwealth Games, winning gold medals in 2010, 2018 and 2022 and silver medals in 2006 and 2010. Wu is a NSW Institute of Sport (NSWIS) scholarship holder.

Diving
Wu began diving in 2003. The same year she fractured her humerus bone in her left arm after accidentally landing on a trampoline, and had to halt training for six months. After winning a number of junior and state titles in 2004 and 2005, she won the individual 10-metre platform at the Australian Open Diving Championships in 2006. The win earned her a place on the team for the 2006 Commonwealth Games in Melbourne, where she won a silver medal in the synchronised 10-metre platform with Alexandra Croak and finished fifth in the individual 10-metre platform.

In 2008, along with Briony Cole, Wu won a silver medal at the 2008 Olympic Games in Beijing for the synchronised 10-metre platform, becoming the youngest Australian ever to win an Olympic medal in diving. She also competed in the women's 10-metre platform, making it into the finals, ending up ranked sixth out of twelve competitors.

At the 2010 Commonwealth Games in Dehli, Wu won a gold medal in the synchronised 10-metre platform with her partner Alexandra Croak and a silver medal in the individual 10-metre platform. 

Wu placed fourth in the 10-metre individual platform at the 2012 Olympic Games in London and fifth in the same event at the 2016 Olympic Games in Rio de Janeiro.

Wu competed at the 2018 Commonwealth Games on the Gold Coast, winning gold in the individual 10-metre platform and, with Teju Williamson, placing fourth in the synchronised 10-metre platform.

Qualifying for her fourth Olympics, Wu competed in the individual 10-metre platform at the 2020 Olympic Games in Tokyo. She achieved a bronze medal.

At the 2022 Commonwealth Games in Birmingham, Wu teamed up with Charli Petrov in the synchronised 10-metre platform. Wu and Petrov achieved a gold medal.

Personal life
Wu lives in Sydney. Her father is of Chinese descent. She is the cousin of Australian Rugby Union player James Stannard and the second cousin of Australian runner Jana Pittman. Her brother Joshua and sister Madeline train in weightlifting.

Wu has a tattoo of the Olympic rings shaped as hearts on her right leg. She also has a tattoo across her left rib featuring the words ‘only as much as I dream can I be.’

Wu competed on SAS Australia in 2022. Following her withdrawal from the course, chief instructor Ant Middleton told her "“If I could have you on my team, I most certainly would, I mean that as well.”

References

External links

 ABC Commonwealth Games profile

1992 births
Living people
Australian female divers
Australian Institute of Sport divers
Australian people of Chinese descent
Commonwealth Games gold medallists for Australia
Commonwealth Games medallists in diving
Commonwealth Games silver medallists for Australia
Divers at the 2006 Commonwealth Games
Divers at the 2008 Summer Olympics
Divers at the 2010 Commonwealth Games
Divers at the 2012 Summer Olympics
Divers at the 2014 Commonwealth Games
Divers at the 2016 Summer Olympics
Divers at the 2020 Summer Olympics
Divers at the 2018 Commonwealth Games
Divers at the 2022 Commonwealth Games
Medalists at the 2008 Summer Olympics
Medalists at the 2020 Summer Olympics
Olympic divers of Australia
Olympic medalists in diving
Olympic silver medalists for Australia
Olympic bronze medalists for Australia
Sportswomen from New South Wales
Divers from Sydney
World Aquatics Championships medalists in diving
20th-century Australian women
21st-century Australian women
Medallists at the 2006 Commonwealth Games
Medallists at the 2010 Commonwealth Games
Medallists at the 2018 Commonwealth Games
Medallists at the 2022 Commonwealth Games